Petchthailand (เพชรไทยแลนด์) is a Thai Muay Thai fighter.

Championships and accomplishments
True4U Muaymanwansuk
 2020 True4U Bantamweight Champion
 2018 True4U Mini Flyweight Champion
World Boxing Council Muaythai
 2019 WBC Muay Thai World Super Flyweight Champion
International Boxing Federation Muaythai
 2019 IBF Muay Thai World Super Flyweight Champion

Fight record

|-  style="background:#cfc;"
| 2023-02-28||  Win||align=left| PetchMuangSuang SitplaiNgam || Muaymansananmuang, Rangsit Stadium || Pathum Thani, Thailand ||  Decision|| 5 ||3:00 

|-  style="background:#cfc;"
| 2023-01-21|| Win ||align=left| PetchMuangSuang SitplaiNgam || Suek Muayded Sangwienduad, Or.Tor.Gor3 Stadium || Nonthaburi province, Thailand || Decision || 5 || 3:00

|-  style="background:#fbb;"
| 2023-01-12|| Loss ||align=left| Somraknoi Muayded789 || Petchyindee, Rajadamnern Stadium || Bangkok, Thailand || Decision || 5||3:00 

|-  style="background:#fbb;"
| 2022-11-06|| Loss ||align=left| Sangkhim Bheut || KAS || Phnom Penh, Cambodia || Decision || 3||3:00

|-  style="background:#cfc;"
| 2022-10-22|| Win||align=left| Yokmorakot Wor.Sangprapai  || Ruamponkon Meepuen|| Samut Sakhon province, Thailand || Decision ||  5||3:00 

|-  style="background:#cfc;"
| 2022-08-26|| Win||align=left| Yokmorakot Wor.Sangprapai  || Muaymanwansuk, Rangsit Stadium|| Pathum Thani, Thailand || Decision || 5 ||3:00 
|-  style="background:#fbb;"
| 2022-06-16 ||Loss ||align=left| Pirapat Muayded789 ||Petchyindee, Rajadamnern Stadium || Bangkok, Thailand || Decision ||5 ||3:00 
|-  style="background:#cfc;"
| 2022-05-26 || Win ||align=left| Puenkon Tor.Surat ||Petchyindee, Rajadamnern Stadium || Bangkok, Thailand || Decision|| 5||3:00
|-  style="background:#cfc;"
| 2022-04-22|| Win ||align=left| Fahpratan SingAchawin || Muaymanwusk, Rangsit Stadium || Rangsit, Thailand || Decision || 5 || 3:00 

|-  style="background:#fbb;"
| 2022-02-10|| Loss ||align=left| Petchwanchai Wor.Sangprapai || Petchyindee, Rajadamnern Stadium || Bangkok, Thailand || Decision || 5 || 3:00 

|-  style="background:#fbb;"
| 2021-12-03|| Loss||align=left| Pirapat Muayded789  || Petchyindee + Muaymanwansuk, Rangsit Stadium || Rangsit, Thailand || Decision ||  5||3:00 
|-
! style=background:white colspan=9 |

|-  style="background:#fbb;"
| 2021-10-29|| Loss ||align=left| Yokmorakot Wor.Sangprapai || Muaymanwansuk|| Buriram province, Thailand || Decision || 5 ||3:00 

|-  style="background:#cfc;"
| 2021-09-30|| Win ||align=left| Pirapat Muayded789  || Petchyindee Road Show|| Buriram province, Thailand || Decision ||  5||3:00 

|-  style="background:#cfc;"
| 2020-12-11|| Win ||align=left| Yodthong Sor.Jor.Tongprajin || True4U Muaymanwansuk, Rangsit Stadium ||Rangsit, Thailand || Decision || 5 || 3:00
|-
! style=background:white colspan=9 |
|-  style="background:#cfc;"
| 2020-11-20|| Win ||align=left| Yodpot Nor.AnuwatGym || True4U Muaymanwansuk, Rangsit Stadium ||Rangsit, Thailand || Decision || 5 || 3:00
|-  style="background:#fbb;"
| 2020-10-09|| Loss ||align=left| Yodthong Sor.Jor.Tongprajin || True4U Muaymanwansuk, Rangsit Stadium ||Rangsit, Thailand || Decision || 5 || 3:00
|-
! style=background:white colspan=9 |
|-  style="background:#cfc;"
| 2020-09-11|| Win||align=left| Yodthong Sor.Jor.Tongprajin || True4U Muaymanwansuk, Rangsit Stadium ||Rangsit, Thailand || Decision || 5 || 3:00
|-  style="background:#fbb;"
| 2020-08-07|| Loss ||align=left| Satanmuanglek Petchyindee || True4U Muaymanwansuk, Rangsit Stadium ||Rangsit, Thailand || KO (Elbow) || 3 ||
|-  style="background:#cfc;"
| 2020-02-26|| Win||align=left| Kwanmongkol Sathianpongmongkolmuay || Wanmitchai, Rajadamnern Stadium ||Bangkok, Thailand || KO (Knees to the body) || 3 ||
|-  style="background:#cfc"
| 2019-11-13 || Win||align=left| Kojima Nor.Naksin || Suk Wan Kingthong "Go to Raja" || Tokyo, Japan || Decision (Unanimous)|| 5 || 3:00
|-
! style=background:white colspan=9 |
|-  style="background:#cfc;"
| 2019-10-14|| Win||align=left| PetchAnuwat Nor.AnuwatGym || Wanmitchai, Rajadamnern Stadium ||Bangkok, Thailand || Decision || 5 || 3:00
|-  style="background:#cfc"
| 2019-08-09 || Win||align=left| Issei Ishii || True4u, Lumpinee Stadium || Bangkok, Thailand || Decision || 5 || 3:00
|-
! style=background:white colspan=9 |
|-  style="background:#cfc;"
| 2019-07-15|| Win||align=left| Rit Sor.Visetkit || Wanmitchai, Rajadamnern Stadium ||Bangkok, Thailand || KO (Low kick) || 2 ||
|-  style="background:#fbb"
| 2019-06-12 || Loss ||align=left| Issei Ishii || Suk Wan Kingthong || Tokyo, Japan || KO (Spinning Back Kick)|| 3 || 3:00
|-
! style=background:white colspan=9 |
|-  style="background:#cfc;"
| 2019-04-10|| Win||align=left| Rungpitak Nuisimoommuang || Wanmitchai, Rajadamnern Stadium ||Bangkok, Thailand || Decision || 5 || 3:00
|-  style="background:#cfc;"
| 2019-02-13|| Win||align=left| Sangfah Nor.AnuwatGym|| WanGingThong, Rajadamnern Stadium ||Bangkok, Thailand || Decision || 5 || 3:00
|-  style="background:#fbb;"
| 2019-01-17|| Loss||align=left| Tayat Or.Prasert || Petchyindee, Rajadamnern Stadium ||Bangkok, Thailand || Decision || 5 || 3:00
|-  style="background:#cfc;"
| 2018-08-27|| Win ||align=left| Fourwheel Sitcharoensap || Wanmitchai, Rajadamnern Stadium ||Bangkok, Thailand || KO (Knees to the body)|| 4 ||
|-  style="background:#fbb;"
| 2018-06-29|| Loss ||align=left| Petchanuwat Nor.AnuwatGym || True4U Muaymanwansuk, Rangsit Stadium ||Rangsit, Thailand || Decision || 5 || 3:00
|-  style="background:#cfc;"
| 2018-05-25|| Win ||align=left| Petchanuwat Nor.AnuwatGym || True4U Muaymanwansuk, Rangsit Stadium ||Rangsit, Thailand || Decision || 5 || 3:00
|-
! style=background:white colspan=9 |
|-  style="background:#cfc;"
| 2018-03-30|| Win ||align=left| Petchwanchai Wor.Sangprapai || True4U Muaymanwansuk, Rangsit Stadium ||Rangsit, Thailand || Decision || 5 || 3:00
|-  style="background:#cfc;"
| 2018-02-23|| Win ||align=left| Petchjongrak Wor.Sangprapai || True4U Muaymanwansuk, Rangsit Stadium ||Rangsit, Thailand || Decision || 5 || 3:00
|-  style="background:#cfc;"
| 2018-01-04|| Win ||align=left| Petchjongrak Wor.Sangprapai || Petchyindee, Rajadamnern Stadium ||Bangkok, Thailand || Decision || 5 || 3:00
|-  style="background:#cfc;"
| 2017-11-17|| Win ||align=left| Kombang Kiatnadee || True4U Muaymanwansuk, Rangsit Stadium ||Rangsit, Thailand || KO || 3 ||
|-  style="background:#fbb;"
| 2017-09-29|| Loss ||align=left| Petchanuwat Nor.AnuwatGym || Rangsit Stadium ||Rangsit, Thailand || Decision || 5 || 3:00
|-  style="background:#fbb;"
| 2017-07-26|| Loss ||align=left| Petchwanchai Gor.Attisak || Petchyindee, Rajadamnern Stadium ||Bangkok, Thailand || TKO || 4 ||
|-  style="background:#cfc;"
| 2017-06-23|| Win ||align=left| Mangkonyok TNMuaythai||  ||Kalasin Province, Thailand || Decision || 5 || 3:00
|-  style="background:#fbb;"
| 2017-05-22|| Loss ||align=left| Santos Sor.Saranpat || Wangingthong, Rajadamnern Stadium ||Bangkok, Thailand || Decision || 5 || 3:00
|-  style="background:#fbb;"
| 2017-04-12|| Loss ||align=left| Petchwanchai Gor.Attisak || Wangingthong, Rajadamnern Stadium ||Bangkok, Thailand || Decision || 5 || 3:00
|-  style="background:#cfc;"
| 2017-02-02|| Win ||align=left| IQ Erawan || Petchyindee, Rajadamnern Stadium ||Bangkok, Thailand || Decision || 5 || 3:00
|-  style="background:#c5d2ea;"
| 2016-11-14|| Draw ||align=left| Seeoi Singmawin || Wangingtong+Petchwiset, Rajadamnern Stadium ||Bangkok, Thailand || Decision || 5 || 3:00
|-  style="background:#cfc;"
| 2016-10-10|| Win ||align=left| Buakawlek Sit.Boonchob ||  ||Thailand || KO || 2 ||
|-
|-
| colspan=9 | Legend:

References

Petchthailand Moopingaroijung
Living people
2001 births